Facundo Manuel Carlos Parra (born 15 June 1985) is an Argentine football striker who plays for Chacarita Juniors in the Argentinian Primera B Nacional.

Club career

Parra started his career in Chacarita Juniors where he played for four years. But he started to become known by playing to Independiente. For the 2010–11 season, Parra joined Independiente on loan. He scored his first goal with the club in a 1–3 defeat to All Boys for the 11th fixture of the Apertura. He scored his second goal for the team in the Copa Sudamericana semifinals victory over LDU Quito, and dedicated it to his dog Max. He then scored two more goals in the competition's final return leg against Goiás (3–1), leading his team to the penalty shootout in which they defeated their rival to win the trophy. During 2010-2012 he played 81 games with Independiente scoring 19 goals and giving 8 assists.

In summer 2014, searching team after a modest season in the ranks of the Independiente (29 games played, 9 goals) Argentine forward Facundo Parra is packing direction to Greek Super League to defend the colors of Asteras Tripolis, making the third step in Europe after playing between 2007 and 2009 for AEL (64 games played, 13 goals) on a loan from Chacarita Juniors  and Atalanta in 2012-2013 (16 games played, 2 goals), playing along Maximiliano Moralez, Germán Denis, Ezequiel Schelotto and Carlos Matheu. However, his arrival at the Greek club left a trail of controversy, as a few hours ago everything was ready to sign with Club Atlético Belgrano, a club where Parra negotiating for days. But this never happened, as the player did not respond during the last hours to either call from the president of the Argentine club or his agent Daniel dos Reis, who was conducting the negotiations and showed his discomfort by the way the player and his environment acted in this deal.

Honours
 Independiente
2010: Copa Sudamericana

References

External links

1985 births
Living people
Footballers from Buenos Aires
Argentine footballers
Argentine expatriate footballers
Chacarita Juniors footballers
Athlitiki Enosi Larissa F.C. players
Club Atlético Independiente footballers
Atalanta B.C. players
Asteras Tripolis F.C. players
Atlético de Rafaela footballers
Santa Cruz Futebol Clube players
Club Agropecuario Argentino players
Club Atlético 3 de Febrero players
Club Nacional footballers
All Boys footballers
FC Carlos Stein players
Argentine Primera División players
Primera Nacional players
Super League Greece players
Serie A players
Campeonato Brasileiro Série B players
Paraguayan Primera División players
Argentina under-20 international footballers
Association football forwards
Argentine expatriate sportspeople in Greece
Argentine expatriate sportspeople in Italy
Argentine expatriate sportspeople in Brazil
Argentine expatriate sportspeople in Paraguay
Argentine expatriate sportspeople in Peru
Expatriate footballers in Greece
Expatriate footballers in Italy
Expatriate footballers in Brazil
Expatriate footballers in Paraguay
Expatriate footballers in Peru